Grigol Bediashvili (born on 7 February 1980) is a Georgian footballer (goalkeeper) playing currently for FC Metalurgi Rustavi.

Bediashvili played for FC WIT Georgia in the first round of the 2005 UEFA Intertoto Cup, the qualifying rounds of the 2006–07 UEFA Cup,

He made his Georgia debut on 10 June 2009 against Albania.

References

External links 
 Grigol Bediashvili profile – WITGeorgia.ge
 

1980 births
Living people
Footballers from Georgia (country)
Georgia (country) international footballers
Association football goalkeepers
FC Dinamo Batumi players
FC Metalurgi Rustavi players
FC WIT Georgia players